Collie Hollow is a valley in Pulaski County in the U.S. state of Missouri.

A variant spelling is "Colly Hollow". The valley has the name of Cyrus , a pioneer citizen.

References

Valleys of Pulaski County, Missouri
Valleys of Missouri